Baillie Gifford US Growth Trust is a large British investment trust. Established in 2018, it is dedicated to investments in United States-based companies. The Chairman is Tom Burnet. It is listed on the London Stock Exchange. It is managed by Edinburgh-based investment manager Baillie Gifford.

References

External links
 Official site

Investment trusts of the United Kingdom